Aleksandr Viktorovich Markin  (Russian: Александр Викторович Маркин; born 8 September 1962) is a retired Russian athlete who specialised in the sprint hurdles. He competed at the 1988 Summer Olympics, as well as one outdoor and two indoor World Championships.

His personal bests are 13.20 seconds in the 110 metres hurdles (+1.8 m/s, Leningrad 1988) and 7.53 seconds in the 60 metres hurdles (Lipetsk 1989).

International competitions

References

1962 births
Living people
Russian male hurdlers
Soviet male hurdlers
Athletes (track and field) at the 1988 Summer Olympics
Olympic athletes of the Soviet Union
People from Moscow Oblast
Competitors at the 1986 Goodwill Games
Sportspeople from Moscow Oblast